Antunes is a surname in the Portuguese language, of patronymic origin meaning "son of Anthony (António)". The Spanish variant is Antúnez or Antunez.

Notable people with the surname include:

Politics
Cármen Lúcia Antunes Rocha (born 1954), Justice of the Supreme Federal Court of Brazil
João do Canto e Castro Antunes (1862–1934), President of Portugal 1918–1919
Manuel Antunes Frasquilho (died 2015), Portuguese politician
Ernesto Melo Antunes (1933–1999), Portuguese politician and general
Manuel Lobo Antunes (born 1958), current Portuguese Ambassador to the United Kingdom

Business
Helder Antunes (born 1963), Portuguese Silicon Valley executive and former racecar driver
Miguel Antunes Frasquilho (born 1967), Portuguese chairman of TAP Air Portugal

Academics
António Lobo Antunes (born 1942), Portuguese writer and psychiatrist
João Lobo Antunes (1944-2016), Portuguese neurosurgeon 
Miguel Telles Antunes (born 1937), Portuguese paleontologist and member of the Lisbon Academy of Sciences
Arnaldo Antunes (born 1960), Brazilian writer and composer
Sandy Antunes (born 1967), American astronomer and writer

Arts
João Antunes (1642–1712), Portuguese Baroque architect
Antunes harpsichord family, 18th century Portuguese harpsichord makers 
Jorge Antunes (born 1942), Brazilian composer
Celso Antunes (born 1959), Brazilian conductor

Athletics
Anderson Andrade Antunes (born 1981), Brazilian footballer
Arthur Antunes Coimbra (born 1953), Brazilian footballer and coach
Macaris Antunes do Livramento (born 1960), Brazilian boxer
Talita Antunes (born 1982), Brazilian beach volleyball player
Vitorino Antunes (born 1987), Portuguese footballer

See also

Jorge Antunes, a sports club based in Vizela, Portugal

Portuguese-language surnames
Patronymic surnames
Surnames from given names